John Francis Dockweiler (September 19, 1895 – January 31, 1943) was an American lawyer and politician who served three terms as a U.S. Representative from California from 1933 to 1939. He also served as the District Attorney of Los Angeles County from 1940-1943.

Biography
John Francis Dockweiler was born in Los Angeles to Isidore Bernard Dockweiler and Gertrude Reeve. As a youth, he tried his hand at acting and theatrical pursuits, but his career never gained momentum. Dockweiler attended parochial schools. He graduated from Loyola College, Los Angeles in 1918 and from the University of Southern California, Los Angeles in 1921. He attended the law department of Harvard University. He was admitted to the bar in 1921, and commenced law practice in Los Angeles in 1922.

Congress 
Dockweiler was elected as a Democrat to the Seventy-third, Seventy-fourth, and Seventy-fifth Congresses (March 4, 1933 – January 3, 1939). He was not a candidate for renomination in the primaries in 1938, but was an unsuccessful candidate for nomination as Governor of California. In the general election, he was an unsuccessful Independent candidate for reelection to the Seventy-sixth Congress.

Later career and death 
He resumed the practice of law. He served as district attorney of Los Angeles County 1940-1943.

He died of pneumonia in Los Angeles, California, on January 31, 1943. He was interred in Calvary Cemetery (New Calvary Catholic Cemetery) in East Los Angeles.

References

External resources

District attorneys in California
Lawyers from Los Angeles
Members of the United States House of Representatives from California
Politicians from Los Angeles
1895 births
1943 deaths
California Independents
Harvard Law School alumni
USC Gould School of Law alumni
Knights of St. Gregory the Great
Catholics from California
American people of German descent
20th-century American politicians
Burials at Calvary Cemetery (Los Angeles)
Democratic Party members of the United States House of Representatives from California
Deaths from pneumonia in California